Maharaja Gangadhar Rao Newalkar was the 5th Raja of Jhansi situated in northern India, a vassal of Maratha Empire. He was a Marathi Karhade Brahmin. He was the son of Shiv Rao Bhau and a descendant of Raghunath Hari Newalkar (who was the first governor of Jhansi under Maratha rule).

Biography
The ancestors of Gangadhar Rao hailed from a Brahmin family of Ratnagiri district of Maharashtra. Some of them moved to Khandesh, when Peshwa rule began and served important posts in the Peshwa and Holkar armies. Raghunath Hari Newalkar strengthened Maratha polity in Bundelkhand, however as he grew old, he handed over the reins of Jhansi to his younger brother Shiv Rao Bhau. On the death of Raghunath Rao III in 1838, the British rulers accepted his brother Gangadhar Rao as the Raja of Jhansi in 1843.

He was an able administrator and he improved the financial condition of Jhansi, which had deteriorated during his predecessor’s rule. He took corrective steps to ensure the growth and development of the town of Jhansi. He controlled an army of around 5,000 men. He possessed wisdom, diplomacy, and was a lover of art and culture; even the British were impressed by his statesmanlike qualities. Gangadhar Rao possessed considerable taste and some scholarship; he collected a fine library of Sanskrit manuscripts and enriched the architecture of the town of Jhansi.

He was first married to Ramabai, who died soon after. She never became queen consort of Jhansi as Gangadhar started to hold the title of Raja (King) in 1843, after Ramabai's death. In May 1842, Gangadhar Rao married a young girl named Manikarnika Tambe, later renamed as Lakshmibai, who was directly given the title of Rani (Queen Consort) after marriage. She eventually became the Queen of Jhansi and revolted against the British during the Indian Rebellion of 1857. 

In September 1851, she gave birth to a boy, named Damodar Rao, who died four months after birth. Raja Gangadhar Rao adopted a child called Anand Rao, the son of his cousin Vasudev Newalkar, who was renamed Damodar Rao, on the day before he died. The adoption was in the presence of the British political officer who was given a letter from the Raja requesting that the child should be treated with kindness and that the government of Jhansi should be given to his widow for her lifetime. After the death of the Raja in November 1853 because Damodar Rao was adopted, the British East India Company, under Governor-General Lord Dalhousie, applied the Doctrine of Lapse, rejecting Damodar Rao's claim to the throne and annexing the state to its territories.

See also
Maratha Empire
Laxmibai, Queen of Jhansi
History of India
Jhansi

References

1797 births
1853 deaths
People of the Maratha Empire
Marathi people
19th-century Indian monarchs
History of Uttar Pradesh
People from Jhansi